Collado Villalba is a municipality of the Community of Madrid, in central Spain. It is located 40.3 kilometres north-west of the city of Madrid, at an altitude of 917 meters above sea level. It has a population of 63,679 (2019), with a population density of about 2,400 per km². Collado Villalba has a hot summer Mediterranean climate (Köppen Csa).

I.E.S Lázaro Cárdenas of Collado Villalba conducts an annual student exchange program with Burlington High School in Burlington, Massachusetts. It has been managed by Professor Ramón José García Rubio for over 20 years. I.E.S María Guerrero has also started an exchange with Minervaskolan High School of Umeå, located 600 kilometres north of Stockholm, in Sweden. In addition to this school-to-school exchange, the municipality has been twinned since 1991 with the French city of Bègles, located in the Bordeaux metropolitan area in Southwestern France.

Public transport

Train

Collado Villalba has its own train station, which gives service to lines C-3a (Aranjuez - El Escorial - Santa María de la Alameda), C-8 (Guadalajara - Cercedilla) and C-10 (Aeropuerto T-4 - Villalba) of Cercanías Madrid. It also gives service to long distance trains going to Salamanca, Ávila or Valladolid.

Bus 

Collado Villalba has many bus lines, most of them connecting the town with Madrid.

 630: Villalba - Galapagar - Colmenarejo - Valdemorillo

 660: San Lorenzo de El Escorial - Guadarrama - Villalba

 670: Villalba Hospital - Moralzarzal

 671: Madrid (Moncloa) - Moralzarzal 

 672: Madrid (Moncloa) - Cerceda (through Mataelpino)

 672a: Madrid (Moncloa) - Cerceda

 673: Madrid (Moncloa) - Villalba

 680: Alpedrete - Villalba Hospital

 681: Madrid (Moncloa) - Alpedrete

 682: Madrid (Moncloa) - Guadarrama

 683 Madrid (Moncloa) - Collado Mediano

 684: Madrid (Moncloa) - Guadarrama - Cercedilla

 685 Majadahonda - Guadarrama 

 687: Madrid (Moncloa) - Villalba (Bus Station)

 688: Madrid (Moncloa) - Los Molinos

 691: Madrid (Moncloa) - Becerril de la Sierra - Navacerrada 

 696: Villalba Hospital - Navacerrada

 720: Colmenar Viejo - Villalba

 876: Madrid (Plaza de Castilla) - Moralzarzal - Villalba

 Night bus line 602: Madrid (Moncloa) - Villalba

 Night bus line 603: Madrid (Moncloa) - Moralzarzal 

 Urban line 1: Train Station - Parque de La Coruña - City Center - Urbanizaciones

 Urban line 2 (circular): Train Station - Parque de La Coruña -  Health Center - Los Negrales - Train Station

 Urban line 3: Train Station - El Gorronal - Villalba Hospital

 Urban line 4: Train Station - Parque de La Coruña - City Center

 Urban line 6: Train Station - Cantos Altos - City Center - Arroyo Arriba

See also
 Los Negrales
 Imperial Route of the Community of Madrid

External links

Collado Villalba City Council

References

Municipalities in the Community of Madrid